Julio César Maglione (born November 14, 1935 in Montevideo, Uruguay) is a former member of the International Olympic Committee (IOC) from Uruguay. He became an IOC member in 1996 and an honorary member in 2015.

Between 1989 and 1990, he served as president of the Uruguayan Football Association

Maglione is the current President of the Uruguayan Olympic Committee (Comité Olímpico Uruguayo, COU), and has held the position since 1987. In July 2009, he was elected President of FINA, the International Swimming Federation. As of July 2013, he is about to be reelected for that post.

In September 2012 he was reelected President of the COU for the period 2012–2016.

Sports positions held

References

1935 births
Living people
Uruguayan male swimmers
Uruguayan referees and umpires
International Olympic Committee members
Uruguay at the Olympics
Presidents of the Uruguayan Football Association
Uruguayan dentists
People from Montevideo